The 2008 World Outdoor Bowls Championship was held at the Burnside Bowling Club in Christchurch, New Zealand, from 12 to 24 January 2008. Safuan Said won the men's singles Gold. New Zealand won the pairs, fours and Leonard Trophy with only Scotland preventing a clean sweep by claiming the triples.

Medallists

Results

W. M. Leonard Trophy

Taylor Trophy

References

 
World Outdoor Bowls Championship
Bowls in New Zealand
Sport in Christchurch
2008 in New Zealand sport
2008 in bowls
January 2008 sports events in New Zealand